is a Japanese voice actress from Yokohama, Japan.

Filmography

Anime
2004
Kurau: Phantom Memory as Washima
Otogi Zoshi as Daughter 2 (ep 2)
Black Jack as Wato

2005
Honey and Clover as Female Student C (ep 3)
Trinity Blood as Jessica Lange
To Heart 2 as Library committee member (ep 3)
Immortal Grand Prix as Amy Stapleton

2006
Witchblade as Aoi
Tactical Roar as Honomi Tateyama; Yui Asarigi
Futari wa Pretty Cure Splash Star as Hitomi Itō
Digimon Savers as Nanami
Ouran High School Host Club as Honoka Kimiwada; Maid A (ep 7,15)
Zegapain as Irie
Black Jack 21 as Wato
Honey and Clover II as Announcer (ep 7)
Marginal Prince as Joshua (Young)
009-1 as Bess (ep 8)
Hataraki Man as Editor (ep 8)

2007
Nodame Cantabile as Kaoru Suzuki
Tokyo Majin Gakuen Kenpucho: Tou as Hinano Oribe; Female Reporter (ep 3)
To Heart 2 as Sasara Kusugawa (ep 3)
Bakugan Battle Brawlers as Lars Lion
Sola as Touko Uehara
Tokyo Majin Gakuen Kenpucho: Tou 2nd Act as Hinano Oribe
Minami-ke as Atsuko
Vassalord

2008
Minami-ke: Okawari as Atsuko

2009
Minami-ke: Okaeri as Atsuko
Aoi Hana as Kawasaki Senpai
Aki Sora as Kana Sumiya
Fairy Tail as Mirajane Strauss, Lullaby, Angelica, Zeref (Ultear's disguise)

2010
Sound of the Sky as Iliya Arkadia
Ōkami-san to Shichinin no Nakamatachi as Ringo's Mother (ep 9)
Yosuga no Sora as Kazuha Migiwa

2011
Oretachi ni Tsubasa wa Nai as Hiyoko Tamaizumi
Bakugan Battle Brawlers New Vestroia as Lars Lion
Mashiroiro Symphony as Airi Sena

2012
Smile PreCure! as Namie Sasaki

2013
Minami-ke: Tadaima as Atsuko

2014
Barakamon as Ikue Kōmoto
D-Frag! as Takao's Older Sister (ep 8)
Fairy Tail [TV-2] as Mirajane Strauss

Video games

Visual novels
Under the name Nazuna Gogyō.
Friends as Mio Suzuya
Hare Tokidoki Otenkiame as Rin
Hoshi Ori Yume Mirai as Rikka Narusawa
Izuna: Legend of the Unemployed Ninja as Fuuka
Kamikaze Explorer! as Kotoha Okihara
Manatsu no Yoru no Yuki Monogatari: Midsummer Snow Night as Kaede Haruno
Mashiroiro Symphony as Airi Sena
Noble Works as Sena Tsukiyama
Oretachi ni Tsubasa wa Nai as Hiyoko Tamaizumi
Princess Lover! as Erika Takezono
Sekai Seifuku Kanojo as Ako Hananomiya
Sono Hanabira ni Kuchizuke o as Kaede Kitajima
Stellar Theater as Kaguya Himenomiya
SuGirly Wish as Anna Tsukigase
Yosuga no Sora as Kazuha Migiwa
Kono Oozora ni, Tsubasa wo Hirogete as Amane Mochizuki
Ao no Kanata no Four Rhythm as Reiko Satōin; credited as Rikka Kitami (PC game) and Ryōko Ono (PSV game)
Fushigi Yūgi: Suzaku Ibun as Misaki Himuro (Priestess of Seiryuu)

Other games
Arcana Heart 2 as Parace L'sia
Azur Lane as Königsberg, Köln, Karlsruhe, and Leipzig
Arknights as Robin

References

 https://web.archive.org/web/20081204062457/http://www.geocities.jp/lesvoixdesanges/vo/ono/onoryouko.html

External links

 Ryōko Ono's personal website 
 Ryōko Ono's profile at Mausu.net 
 Ryōko Ono at GamePlaza-Haruka Voice Acting Database 
 Ryōko Ono at Hitoshi Doi's Seiyuu Database 

1977 births
Living people
Japanese voice actresses
People from Yokohama